Frank Kelley may refer to:

Frank J. Kelley (1924–2021), Attorney General of the U.S. state of Michigan
Frank Kelley (tenor), American tenor

See also
Frank Kelly (disambiguation)
Francis Kelley (1870–1948), Roman Catholic bishop, author and diplomat